The French Polynesia national handball team is the national handball team of French Polynesia.

Pacific Handball Cup record

External links
 Profile on International Handball Federation webpage
 Oceania Continent Handball Federation webpage

Men's national handball teams
H